Lin Hei'er (1871 – 1900?) was a Chinese rebel during the Boxer Rebellion, known as the Holy Mother of the Yellow Lotus. She was a prostitute and acrobat with martial arts knowledge who became a member of the Yihetuan. During the Boxer Rebellion, she organized and commanded the Red Lantern unit of female soldiers in Tianjin.

Life
Born on a Tianjin canal houseboat, Lin studied acrobatics and earned a living as an itinerant entertainer with her father. She married Li Youchuan while still very young. Li Youchuan was arrested by British soldiers during a raid against the opium trade and died in prison. Later, she became a prostitute in Houjia, on the south bank of the South Canal in the Hongqiao District, Tianjin. Furious against foreigners because of the death of Li Youchuan, Hei'er joined the rebels of the Yihetuan. Once trained in martial arts, she trained female recruits and founded the Red Lantern Unit of young female soldiers, the name coming from the color of their clothes. With rebel's widows she formed the Blue Lantern Unit and with the old women, the Black Lantern Unit. In addition she formed the Pan Lantern Unit of cooks who were in charge of feeding the rebel troops. She recruited prostitutes, beggars and peasants into her ranks and rejected well-to-do women as useless "lotus feet".

In July 1900, the combined force of the Eight-Nation Alliance descended on Beijing and Tianjin and looted and pillaged the cities. Lin Hei'er and other leaders put up fierce resistance. Lin Hei'er was injured during the Battle of Tientsin and was captured along with the other leaders on July 14, 1900, when the imperial troops who secretly helped the rebels abandoned them to their fate. Her final destination is unknown. Probably she was tried and executed, although turned into a popular heroine, the popular songs proclaimed that she survived.

A monument in her honor, the Red Lantern monument, was erected in 1994 near her place of birth.

See also
List of people who disappeared

References

Bibliography

1871 births
1900 deaths
Year of death uncertain
19th-century Chinese people
19th-century Chinese women
Chinese acrobatic gymnasts
Chinese female prostitutes
Chinese people of the Boxer Rebellion
Qing dynasty rebels
Gymnasts from Tianjin
Missing person cases in China
Women in 19th-century warfare